The Buddha and His Dhamma, is a 1957 treatise on Buddha's life and philosophy. It was the last work of Indian statesman and scholar B. R. Ambedkar. According to Queen (2015), the text is treated as scripture for those who follow Navayana Buddhism.

Publication history
The Buddha and His Dhamma was first published in 1957 in the year following Ambedkar's death on 6 December 1956. Written in English, the book has been translated to many languages, including Hindi, Gujarati, Telugu, Tamil, Marathi, Malayalam, Bengali and Kannada.

It was republished in 1979 as the eleventh volume of Ambedkar's collected writings and speeches, with a list of sources and an index.

B.R. Ambedkar mentioned that it is one of the three books which he believed to form a set for the proper understanding of Buddhism. The other two books are:
 Buddha and Karl Marx; and
 Revolution and Counter-Revolution in Ancient India.

In popular culture
A Hindi-language film, A Journey of Samyak Buddha, is based on The Buddha and His Dhamma.

See also
 A Journey of Samyak Buddha
 B. R. Ambedkar bibliography

References

Bibliography
 
 Baumann, Martin (1991). "Neo-Buddhistische Konzeptionen in Indien und England: Zum 100. Geburtstag Bhimrao Ramji Ambedkars".  , 43 (2), pp. 97-116.
 Fiske, Adele & Emmrich, Christoph (2004). The use of Buddhist scriptures in B.R. Ambedkar's The Buddha and His Dhamma. [In] Jondhale, Surendra; Beltz, Johannes (eds.). Reconstructing the World: B.R. Ambedkar and Buddhism in India. New Delhi: Oxford University Press.

External links
  Book Online

Books by B. R. Ambedkar
History of India in fiction
1957 non-fiction books
Navayana
Buddhism studies books
Books adapted into films
Books about Gautama Buddha
Books published posthumously